The 1990–91 Montreal Canadiens season was the Canadiens' 82nd season. The Canadiens finished second in both the division and the conference to the Boston Bruins. Montreal defeated the Buffalo Sabres in the first round before losing to Boston in the Adams Division Finals in seven games.

Offseason
Co-Captain Chris Chelios was traded to the Chicago Blackhawks for Denis Savard, in August 1990. With Chelios' departure, Guy Carbonneau continued as Canadiens captain.

Mats Naslund resumes his playing career in Europe. Veteran forwards Brian Skrudland and Mike McPhee are named alternate captains.

NHL Draft
Montreal's draft picks at the 1990 NHL Entry Draft held at the BC Place in Vancouver, British Columbia.

Regular season
In terms of injuries, Patrick Roy missed the most games due to injury during the 90-91 season. Backup goalies Andre Racicot and Jean-Claude Bergeron appeared in 25 games.
 December 12, 1990: Petr Svoboda and Toronto Maple Leafs winger Wendel Clark fell on Patrick Roy's left knee. Roy suffered strained ligaments.
 January 27, 1991: Donald Dufresne checked Bruins right winger Graeme Townshend. He fell on Patrick Roy's left ankle. Roy suffered a ruptured ligament and missed fourteen games. Roy would re-injure the ankle on March 16.

The Canadiens finished the regular season as the league's most disciplined team, being short-handed only 282 times.

Final standings

Playoffs 
The Montreal Canadiens were eliminated in the Adams Division final by the Boston Bruins, four games to three.

Schedule and results

Player statistics

Regular season
Scoring

Goaltending

Playoffs
Scoring

Goaltending

Transactions
 In November 1990, Brian Hayward was traded to the Minnesota North Stars for defenseman Jayson More.

References
 Canadiens on Hockey Database
 Canadiens on NHL Reference

Montreal Canadiens seasons
Montreal Canadiens season, 1990-91
Montreal